"I Should Be..." is the first single from Dru Hill's third album, Dru World Order. The single peaked at #25 on the Hot 100 and #6 on the R&B chart. The song stayed on the Hot 100 chart for a total of 17 weeks.

Music video
The music video was directed by Chris Robinson.

Track listing

Charts

Weekly charts

Year-end charts

References

2003 singles
Dru Hill songs
2002 songs